Muigg is a surname of Austrian origin. Notable people with the surname include:

 Josef Muigg (born 1960), Austrian bobsledder
 Theresa Muigg (born 1984), Austrian politician

See also
 Muggia

Surnames of Austrian origin